Persian Gulf Airport  is an airport in Assaluyeh, Iran.

The airport has been operating since 2005 and, though small, enjoys one of the most modern passenger terminal buildings recently built in the region. There are frequent scheduled and charter passenger flights every day operated by Mahan Air, Kish Air, Iran Aseman Airlines, Taban Air and Caspian Airlines to cities across Iran, including Tehran, Mashhad, Isfahan, Shiraz, Tabriz, Ahwaz, Rasht, Kish Island and Kermanshah, with weekly international flights to Dubai, operated by Mahan Air.

Development Phase 
A development phase for the airport has been designed and approved by officials. The project will cost about US$62 million and include a new four-kilometer runway and a new 14,000 square-meter terminal. The latter will have seven air-bridges and be connected to the current terminal by a corridor. On completion of the project, the international and domestic terminals will be separate, although both will use the air-bridges. Project studies and engineering have been finished and execution activities are in preparation.

Airlines and destinations

See also 
Iran Civil Aviation Organization
List of airlines of Iran
List of airports in Iran
List of the busiest airports in Iran
Transport in Iran

References

External links 
 
 

Airports in Iran
Transportation in Bushehr Province
Buildings and structures in Bushehr Province